This list of international units is subsidiary to the list of units article and lists widely used modern units in a form of sortable table.

Notes

Lists of units of measurement